Llantwit Major is the name of an electoral ward in the Vale of Glamorgan, Wales. It covers its namesake town of Llantwit Major and neighbouring village of Llanmaes. The ward elects four county councillors to the Vale of Glamorgan Council.

According to the 2011 census the population of the ward was 10,621.

Boundary changes
In 2022 St Donats community was transferred to the St Brides Major ward, as a result of recommendations from the Local Democracy and Boundary Commission for Wales. However, Llantwit Major retained four county councillors.

Election results

2022 Vale of Glamorgan
All four sitting Llantwit First councillors retained their seats.

2017 Vale of Glamorgan
At the May 2017 County Council elections all four seats were won by candidates standing as Llantwit First Independents, increasing their numbers by one.

2012 Vale of Glamorgan/2015 by-election
Following the 2012 election Llantwit First Independent councillor Eric Hacker was elected as mayor of the county council for the ensuing 12 months. Llantwit First Independents supported the minority Labour Group to give Labour a majority control of the county council. Councillor Keith Geary died on 4 January 2015, leaving a seat vacant.

At the by-election on 26 March 2015 the vacant seat was won by Tony Bennett for the Conservatives, by 12 votes.

2008 Vale of Glamorgan

* = sitting councillor prior to the election

1973–1996
Between 1973 and 1996 Llantwit Major was a ward to the Vale of Glamorgan Borough Council, electing 3 councillors initially, then 4 councillors from 1983. The ward was represented by a mixture of Labour and Conservative councillors.

References

Vale of Glamorgan electoral wards
electoral ward